Albert Jenicot (15 February 1885 – 22 February 1916) was a French footballer. He competed in the men's tournament at the 1908 Summer Olympics. He was killed in action during World War I.

See also
 List of Olympians killed in World War I

References

External links
 
 
 

1885 births
1916 deaths
French footballers
France international footballers
Olympic footballers of France
Footballers at the 1908 Summer Olympics
Footballers from Lille
Association football forwards
France B international footballers
French military personnel killed in World War I
RC Roubaix players